Tatiparthi is a village in Gollaprolu Mandal, located in Kakinada district of the Indian state of Andhra Pradesh.Its famous for various types of Sarees at cheaper prices.Famous Aparna devi temple is located here.people in the vicinity of tatiparthi are supposed to believe in the power of goddes aparnadevi.it is also well known for yearly celebrations of lord subrahmaneswara swamy shasti mahotsav.

Climate

The climate is dry and moderate throughout the year. The hottest part of the year is between April to mid June with maximum temperatures around 38–42 °C (100–108 °F). The coolest part of the year is January, with minimum temperatures around 18–20 °C (64–68 °F). The city gets most of its seasonal rainfall from the south-west monsoon winds although a good deal of rains greet these parts during the northeast monsoon from mid-October to mid-December. Depressions/cyclones in the Bay of Bengal causes heavy rain falls and thunderstorms.

References

Villages in Gollaprolu mandal